Ozarks International Raceway is a multi-use race track that opened in 2022. The track has circuits for a  paved road-course racing, off-road racing, rally, and a dirt tri-oval. The track hosts events on the Lamborghini Super Trofeo and GT World Challenge America circuits.

Construction
The raceway was the idea of race driver J.R. Pesek. Pesek was quoted by KTVI, "This part of the country, I think, is kind of starving for the track." The race circuit was built in the early 2020s on the site of a closed farm named 4 J Farms. The circuit was designed to minimize its effect to the land. Pesek was quoted, "The trees and designing of the racetrack, we only took down what we had to. There wasn’t many we had to take down, we’re trying to respect the environment." A 58-bay garage was constructed from repurposed turkey barns. It has a  control tower and media center. The construction utilized local labor, materials and primarily local companies.

History
The track was scheduled to be open for testing and rentals in late 2021. The track opened in April 2022. In its debut year, it hosted the Porsche Sprint Challenge North America Cayman cars and USF Juniors on April 22 to 24. The USF Juniors race was the series' debut; both events on the first features day (April 23) were won by Mac Clark. The second day (April 24) rained out. The track is hosting IMSA's Lamborghini Super Trofeo championship and SRO's GT World Challenge America championship as its first professional events on May 20 to 22. But on April 27, 2022, the SRO announced that Ozarks round in 2022 was replaced with NOLA Motorsports Park on the same date due to the challenges related with infrastructure and supply chain.

Tracks
The main track is the 17-turn  road course. The track has  of elevation with eight rises and drops. The road course has a  outer and  inner circuits via connecting routes.

Events

 2022
 April: Porsche Sprint Challenge North America, USF Juniors
 June: Spec Corvette Nationals NASA Central
 October: World Racing League Ozarks 8+8 h

Lap records

The fastest official race lap records at the Ozarks International Raceway are listed as:

References

External links
Official Website

2022 establishments in Missouri
Buildings and structures in Morgan County, Missouri
Motorsport venues in Missouri
Road courses in the United States
Sports venues completed in 2022
IMSA GT Championship circuits
Tourist attractions in Morgan County, Missouri